is a constituency of the House of Councillors in the Diet of Japan (national legislature). It represents Ehime Prefecture and elects two Councillors, one every three years by a first-past-the-post system for a six-year term. In the first election in 1947, Ehime like all districts used single non-transferable vote to elect both its Councillors in one election. It has 1,169,427 registered voters as of September 2015. As a predominantly rural district, it has favoured the Liberal Democratic Party (LDP) candidate in most elections.

The current Councillors for Ehime are:
Junzo Yamamoto (LDP, third term, expires 2022)
Takako Nagae (Independent, first term, expires 2025)

Current Councillors 
As of 31 January 2023, the current Councillors for Ehime are:
Junzo Yamamoto (LDP, third term, expires 2022)
Takako Nagae (Independent, first term, expires 2025)

Elected Councillors

Election Results

Elections in the 2020s

Elections in the 2010s

Elections in the 2000s

Elections in the 1990s

Elections in the 1980s

Elections in the 1970s

Elections in the 1960s

Elections in the 1950s

Elections in the 1940s

References 

Districts of the House of Councillors (Japan)